Marko Kelemen (born 29 April 2000) is a Slovak footballer who plays for MFK Ružomberok as a forward.

Club career
Kelemen made his Fortuna Liga debut for Spartak Trnava against iClinic Sereď on 21 July 2019.

References

External links
 FC Spartak Trnava official club profile 
 Futbalnet profile 
 
 

2000 births
Living people
Slovak footballers
Slovakia youth international footballers
Slovakia under-21 international footballers
Association football forwards
FC Spartak Trnava players
FC ViOn Zlaté Moravce players
Kazincbarcikai SC footballers
FC Petržalka players
MFK Ružomberok players
Slovak Super Liga players
Nemzeti Bajnokság II players
2. Liga (Slovakia) players
Expatriate footballers in Hungary
Slovak expatriate sportspeople in Hungary
People from Rožňava